Nenad Janković (born 11 December 1962), known as Dr Nele Karajlić, is a Bosnian Serb musician, composer, comedian, actor, writer and television director living and working in Belgrade, Serbia. One of the founders of the New Primitivism cultural movement in his hometown of Sarajevo, he was also the lead singer and co-author for one of former Yugoslavia's best known bands, Zabranjeno Pušenje (No Smoking).

Karajlić also co-created and participated in TV shows Top lista nadrealista (The Surrealist Hit Parade) and Složna braća. During the Bosnian War, he moved to Belgrade where he formed one of two descendant factions of Zabranjeno Pušenje. That splinter of the band was joined by filmmaker Emir Kusturica, and renamed it The No Smoking Orchestra.

Early life
Janković was born on 11 December 1962, in Sarajevo, SFR Yugoslavia, present day Bosnia and Herzegovina into a middle-class family. His father Srđan Janković was a linguist and professor of Oriental sciences at the University of Sarajevo's Faculty of Philosophy. In his youth, Nenad was a mischievous kid with short attention span.

Following in his father's footsteps, Janković also studied Orientalism at the same school where his father taught. However, as his music and TV career took off, the studies were no longer a priority and he never finished them.

He initially took a nom de guerre "Dr Nele Karajlić" as an inside joke. The name was supposed to recall the wartime practice of Partisan conspirators from World War II, who were lionized in state-sponsored movies and television series. The surname Karajlić vaguely recalls Bosnian Muslim ancestry, obfuscating his Serbian ancestry, despite the fact that it was entirely fabricated. Other Zabranjeno Pušenje members and friends were similarly and misleadingly nicknamed. "It later proved to be useful," he once said, "since no one outside our group could really tell which nationality we were when the pre-war ethnic tensions started".^

Music career

Nele and Sejo – the original Zabranjeno Pušenje
As Zabranjeno Pušenje's music and shtick started to catch on all over ex-Yugoslavia during mid-'80s, Nele became one of the better-known public figures in the entire country. His deliberately low-brow and unkempt style were paired with a similar philosophical streak of New Primitivism that the band claimed to follow and propagate.

Never content to merely let the music do the talking, Nele often engaged in matters he knew would create a stir. Some of them, like the now-famous 'Marshall episode' (when Nele declared during a concert "The Marshall croaked. I mean, the amplifier"), seem ridiculously benign and innocuous by today's standards but nevertheless raised a furor in the post-Tito socialist Yugoslavia of the 1980s. Band's pre-show press conferences often assumed the form of a debate club with Nele charming journalists while pontificating on issues ranging from lower league soccer to Karl Marx's Manifesto. It was part publicity tool, part socio-political theatre.

As far as on-stage behavior goes, dr Nele Karajlić was probably the first Yugo rock frontman to take a truly active approach while in front of a crowd. Fully utilizing the stage equipment, he would climb stage walls, dive into the audience, rip his clothes off, simulate fellatio on microphones, flip crowds off, etc. One particular occasion during 1985/86 tour at Vatroslav Lisinski Concert Hall in Zagreb (place that usually hosts opera singers and symphony orchestras and hence has a bolted down concert piano on stage) saw him get on top of the said piano, and proceeding to dry hump it for an extended period – all of which got him a big cheer from the crowd but also managed to offend many purists.

The band started to hit it big fairly quickly. Their debut album Das ist Walter appeared in June 1984 and it was soon apparent that their popularity would soon grow beyond the city of Sarajevo. A national tour followed, which brought Nele more attention. They played a sold-out show (6,000 capacity) at Hala sportova in Belgrade on 4 November 1984. At this time Nele was also starring on the Top lista nadrealista sketch comedy TV show, soon making him a celebrity. His face started popping up on fold-out posters in entertainment magazines and he was talked about by the media.

Over the next seven years Zabranjeno Pušenje recorded three more studio albums and played countless sold-out arenas until, in late 1991, Nele and Davor Sučić (aka "Sejo Sexon") decided to go their separate ways. The Nele-Sejo relationship was always the band's nucleus. Having written lyrics and music for most of the songs, the duo was running the band while rest of the group employed a revolving door policy. The circumstances under which Zabranjeno Pušenje ceased to exist in its first incarnation, are not entirely clear. In later interviews, Nele has explicitly stated that Zabranjeno Pušenje disbanded when Sejo informed him about not wanting to play anymore in late 1991 and that it had nothing to do with the war, while Sejo seems to suggest the break-up occurred implicitly when Nele fled for Belgrade in the spring of 1992, soon after fighting flared up in Bosnia. There is no indication they've ever met face to face since then, except after Sejo's father died and they reunited for a night of drinking at a bar. Their already complex working-business friendship-relationship was further burdened by their ethnic background – Nele is a Serb while Sejo is identifying himself as a Bosnian, although of Croatian descent. Although never openly hostile in interviews when the topic of old times is broached, both men noticeably try to project an air of indifference about one another.

Dr Karajlić goes to Belgrade
In Belgrade, Nele was a refugee – albeit a famous one. Together with his wife Sanja and their infant daughter he spent his first Belgrade days in the apartment belonging to Rambo Amadeus. For the most part, music was the furthest thing on his mind during this period. He could be seen across town waiting in lines in front of different charity organizations like ADRA to send food packages to family members in Sarajevo which was under siege by Serbian forces.

His first post-original-Zabranjeno Pušenje music gig was a low-publicity duet with Toni Montano on a quickly forgotten track called "Srećna porodica".  Throughout the 1993 through 1996 period, Nele played with different musicians on a recreational basis under the name Zabranjeno Pušenje. He did not record any new material and would occasionally play an odd club date or two in Belgrade. In September 1995 he traveled to Toronto where he met up with Mladen Pavičić 'Pava', formerly of Plavi Orkestar, and some local musicians, including drummer Boris Daich and bassist Nenad Stanojevic, for a Zabranjeno Pušenje show. During this time he also collected and honed material for a possible new album, although he was not quite sure when or even if he would like to release it. Or, for that matter, if Belgrade audiences still had any interest in a band-less rocker from Sarajevo.

The event that finally made him realize he could still be relevant was a concert at Belgrade's Tašmajdan stadium which the band booked somewhat pretentiously for 13 September 1996. The place seats around 10,000 and the plan was to play old Zabranjeno Pušenje songs with some unfinished new material sprinkled in throughout. Amazingly, the stadium was packed and the show turned into a comeback triumph for Nele that couldn't be spoiled even by the pouring rain. On the strength of their Belgrade success the new band embarked on a mini-tour across SR Yugoslavia, Macedonia, Bosnia and Slovenia during which they played some memorable arena gigs in Novi Sad, Skopje, Banja Luka and Ljubljana.

This sudden unexpected surge of public interest made Nele feel added responsibility for the quality of the material about to be released, so he postponed the already set album release date because he felt songs were still not tight enough. Finally in 1997, the Belgrade fraction of Zabranjeno Pušenje (of which Nele was the only original member) released Ja nisam odavle (I'm not from around 'ere) which did very well commercially in Serbia even if reviews weren't as glowing.

In 1998, members of the Belgrade Zabranjeno Pušenje joined forces with Riblja Čorba's Bora Đorđević under the name Riblje Pušenje (Fish Smoking) to record two Yugoslavia fan songs for the upcoming soccer World Cup in France. Two tracks entitled "Pobednička Pesma" (Winners' Song) and "Gubitnička Pesma" (Losers' Song) featured Nele and Bora singing praises and insults respectively to the SR Yugoslavia national team. The idea was to have a song ready for each case – victory and defeat.

Around this time Nele collaborated with film director and former Zabranjeno Pušenje bass player, Emir Kusturica, on the soundtrack for the Black Cat, White Cat movie. Off that record, the track "Pit bull" became a moderate hit as well as "Bubamara" – a gypsy brass version of "Ženi nam se Vukota" (Vukota's Getting Married) from Ja nisam odavle.

The No Smoking Orchestra

After Black Cat, White Cat finished its theatrical life, Nele and the band were approached by Emir Kusturica for an Italian tour in the summer of 1999, right after the NATO bombing of FR Yugoslavia. The idea was obviously to ride the wave of Kusturica's popularity so the band got renamed to Emir Kusturica & The No Smoking Orchestra even if the famous director had a fairly minor musical role in it. The tour named Effeti Collaterali was a big success and they soon released a Europe-wide album for Universal named Unza Unza Time.

This was the third incarnation of Zabranjeno pusenje (second after Nele's split from the original band). They did away with traditional rock'n'roll sound but kept the attitude. Booming guitar took a back seat to accordion and violin, while Nele's scratchy howl assumed a more sedated tone. In the 2001 documentary Super 8 Stories legendary Joe Strummer, clearly at a loss for words, describes their sound as "this crazy Greek-Jewish wedding music of the past,... and the future".

That movie, directed by Kusturica details goings-on throughout their first two tours. A second one that started in the spring of 2000 saw them pay visits to cities in France, Spain, Portugal, Germany and of course Italy, which had by this time become their business base.

The band's touring agenda was set around Kusturica's movie schedule (he was shooting Life Is a Miracle at the time), which is why they waited until 2004 for the next tour that in addition to their usual stomping grounds also took them to places as Argentina, Brazil, Chile, Venezuela and Israel.

Even if he does not have the highest billing anymore, Nele is still the band's de facto frontman. Kusturica's role is that of a Trojan horse – his starpower draws people to shows, he then does his talking bit at the beginning and in-between some songs (often purposely delivered in broken English) and finally turns the audience over to Nele & Co. Being aware of his limited playing capabilities, Kustarica takes a backseat role as the rhythm guitar player.

It is a setup that suits Nele. He and the band would probably never have the opportunity to achieve an international music career on their own and that is why Nele often likens Kusturica's approach and the subsequent band's transformation to "someone opening a window in a stuffy room".

Ironically, this makeover robbed them of huge popularity at home in Serbia. This was most evident on 3 July 2004 when they played their first and so far only domestic show in Belgrade. Conceptually it was to be a celebration of the band's 20th anniversary (if continuity is assumed through all of the band's incarnations) for which they joined forces with another local favourite Riblja Čorba, who were celebrating their 25th.

The concert drew 40,000 but it quickly turned unpleasant after No Smoking Orchestra took the stage. The crowd coldly tolerated their new shtick (songs in Spanish, German, Romany and English, Nele's new ethno getup, etc.) throughout the first few songs but soon began to show hostility when it became clear the old classics would not be played. Instead of Zabranjeno Pušenje, the crowd got The No Smoking Orchestra, and they did not like it. The stage was pelted with half-filled plastic water bottles forcing the band to abandon their set after barely 40 minutes. It was an unpleasant homecoming and a clear statement that their new style is not welcomed by hardcore fans.

The band did not dwell on it and they continued the tour, crossing Europe, South America and even parts of Asia. In May 2005 they played a show in Cannes, France, during the film festival for a movie industry crowd including Salma Hayek and Javier Bardem.

Writing
In June 2014, Karajlić's autobiography Fajront u Sarajevu (Last Call in Sarajevo) got released. In addition to glowing reviews and notices, it also did well commercially, selling more than 80,000 copies by the end of 2014. He also wrote FBI-Tesla files, United brothers and Thessaloniki's 28.

References

External links

1962 births
Living people
Musicians from Sarajevo
Serbs of Bosnia and Herzegovina
Bosnia and Herzegovina emigrants to Serbia
Yugoslav musicians
Bosnia and Herzegovina musicians
Male actors from Sarajevo
Bosnia and Herzegovina rock singers
Serbian rock singers
Serbian punk rock musicians
Serbian film score composers
Yugoslav rock singers
New Primitivism people
Zabranjeno pušenje members
Top lista nadrealista
Indexi Award winners
Yugoslav Wars refugees